Dr. K.L. Johar is the founding Vice-Chancellor of Guru Jambheshwar University of Science and Technology, Hisar. Before that, was pro-Vice Chancellor at Kurukshetra University. He is in planning board of Guru Jambheshwar University of Science and Technology.

References

1936 births
Living people
Academic staff of Guru Jambheshwar University of Science and Technology
Place of birth missing (living people)
Heads of universities and colleges in India